Encolpius is a genus of South American jumping spiders that was first described by Eugène Louis Simon in 1900.  it contains only three species, found only in Argentina, Venezuela, and Brazil: E. albobarbatus, E. fimbriatus, and E. guaraniticus.

References

Salticidae
Salticidae genera
Spiders of South America